Robert Jens Rock (born April 19, 1954) is a Canadian record producer, sound engineer and musician, best known for producing rock bands and music artists such as Metallica, Mötley Crüe, Bon Jovi, Aerosmith, The Tragically Hip,  the Cult, 311, Our Lady Peace, Bryan Adams, the Offspring, Michael Bublé, Black Veil Brides, David Lee Roth, and Ron Sexsmith.

Payolas and Rock and Hyde

Rock began his music career in Langford, British Columbia (a suburb of Victoria), as a guitarist playing with friends William Alexander and Paul Hyde in the former's household basement. After high school graduation, Rock left Victoria and became the co-founder of the Payolas, who became well known with the success of their 1980s hit, "Eyes of a Stranger", which was used as part of the soundtrack of the movie Valley Girl starring Nicolas Cage.

In 1983, the Payolas won the Juno Award for Single of the Year. Rock also worked as an assistant engineer at Little Mountain Sound in Vancouver. In 1987, the band (who had by then changed their name to Paul Hyde and the Payolas) again changed their name to Rock and Hyde and had two hit singles in Canada with the song "Dirty Water" (#20), which also charted on Billboard's Hot 100, and "I Will (#40). In 2007, the Payolas became briefly active once more as a touring and recording act, releasing the EP Langford Part One.

Production career
Rock is well known as a producer for heavy metal bands such as Metallica and Mötley Crüe. He has also worked with Aerosmith, Bon Jovi, Blue Murder, the Moffatts, Cher, the Cult, David Lee Roth, Skid Row, Veruca Salt, Nina Gordon, the Offspring, 311, Our Lady Peace, the Tragically Hip, the Tea Party, Lostprophets, American Hi-Fi, Simple Plan, Tonic, Nelly Furtado, Jann Arden, and Ron Sexsmith.

Rock briefly returned to performing, forming the band Rockhead with ex-Payolas drummer Chris Taylor. The band released one self-titled album and two singles before splitting up. Rock produced the five finalist songs of CBC Sports's Hockey Night in Canada Anthem Challenge in late 2008.

Metallica

In 1990, Rock was chosen to produce Metallica's Diamond-certified (16× Platinum) self-titled album (commonly referred to as The Black Album). He would subsequently produce Load (1996), ReLoad (1997), the new material for the band's cover album, Garage Inc. (1998), and St. Anger (2003).

Rock also wrote and played all of the bass guitar parts on St. Anger, as Jason Newsted left Metallica in January 2001, and was the bassist for the band's few live performances until Robert Trujillo joined the band in February 2003. Rock was featured prominently in the 2004 documentary film Metallica: Some Kind of Monster, which dealt with Metallica's internal strife and their struggles with the creative process during the recording of St. Anger.

In February 2006, Metallica chose producer Rick Rubin to produce their next album, ending the band's long-time relationship with Rock. At Metallica's 30th Anniversary Concert on December 10, 2011, Rock joined Metallica onstage, and performed bass alongside Trujillo on the songs "Dirty Window" and "Frantic".

Awards
Rock's career both as a producer and musician was recognized at the 2007 Juno Awards ceremony in Saskatoon for his lifetime contribution to popular music. He was inducted into the Canadian Music Hall of Fame by the Canadian Academy of Recording Arts and Sciences (CARAS). "Bob is a musical craftsman whose wide range of talents show no signs of slowing," said Melanie Berry, CARAS President. "He has helped to define rock as we know it today, and we are very proud to recognize him in the Canadian Music Hall of Fame."

Rock has received 4x multi-platinum for "Wanted Dead or Alive" and 2x multi-platinum for "Livin' on a Prayer" by Bon Jovi.

Rock confirmed his acceptance of the award: "It is an honour to join great producers like Bob Ezrin, Bruce Fairbairn, Daniel Lanois, Jack Richardson, and David Foster in the Canadian Music Hall of Fame" said Rock. "They are all giants of the industry, and to be recognized, means that I had to have worked with truly great artists. I thank them for their confidence and inspiration."

Rock has received nominations for 17 Juno Awards in various categories, including "Producer of the Year", "Recording Engineer of the Year", "Composer of the Year", and "Entertainer of the Year". He has won on numerous occasions for both his production work and his work with Payola$ and Rock and Hyde.

Rock last won Producer of the Year in 2005 for Simple Plan's "Welcome to My Life". He was nominated for 2007 Producer of the Year for his work on The Tragically Hip's album World Container. In 2014, Rock won a Grammy Award for Best Traditional Pop Vocal Album for his work on Michael Bublé's album To Be Loved.
In 2023 Rock won a Grammy Award for “Best Traditional Pop Vocal Album” for his work on Michael Bublé's album Higher.

Discography

Musician
Payolas In a Place Like This (1981)
Payolas No Stranger to Danger (1982)
Strange Advance Worlds Away (1982)
Payolas Hammer on a Drum (1983)
Paul Hyde & The Payolas Here's the World for Ya (1985)
Zappacosta A to Z (1986)
Rock and Hyde Under the Volcano (1987)
Mötley Crüe Dr. Feelgood (1989)
 Rockhead Rockhead (1992)
 Metallica St. Anger (2003)
Gord Downie, Lustre Parfait (2023)

Producer
 1979 Young Canadians Hawaii (EP)
 1979 The Subhumans Death Was Too Kind (EP)
 1980 Pointed Sticks Perfect Youth
 1981 Payolas In a Place Like This
 1984 Servant Light Maneuvers
 1986 Zappacosta A to Z
 1986 The Cheer Shot with Our Own Guns
 1987 Rock and Hyde Under the Volcano
 1988 Kingdom Come Kingdom Come
 1988 Colin James
 1989 The Cult Sonic Temple
 1989 Blue Murder Blue Murder
 1989 Mötley Crüe Dr. Feelgood
 1989 Loverboy Big Ones (new material)
 1990 Little Caesar Little Caesar
 1990 Electric Boys Funk 'o Metal Carpet Ride
 1991 David Lee Roth A Little Ain't Enough
 1991 Metallica Metallica (The Black Album)
 1991 Mötley Crüe Decade of Decadence (new material)
 1992 Cher Love Hurts
 1992 Bon Jovi Keep the Faith
 1992 Rockhead Rockhead
 1993 Quireboys Bitter Sweet & Twisted
 1994 Mötley Crüe Mötley Crüe
 1994 The Cult The Cult
 1995 Skid Row Subhuman Race
 1996 Metallica Load
 1997 Metallica Reload
 1997 Veruca Salt Eight Arms to Hold You
 1998 Metallica Garage Inc. (Disc 1)
 1998 Bryan Adams On a Day Like Today
 1998 Mötley Crüe Greatest Hits (new material)
 1999 Tal Bachman
 1999 Metallica S&M
 2000 Sins of the Fallen Son The Raven
 2000 Nina Gordon Tonight and the Rest of My Life
 2000 Paul Hyde Living off the Radar
 2000 Metallica I Disappear
 2000 The Moffatts Submodalities
 2001 American Hi-Fi American Hi-Fi
 2001 Antifreez The Sunshine Daisies
 2001 The Cult Beyond Good and Evil
 2001 Econoline Crush Brand New History
 2002 Our Lady Peace Gravity
 2003 Tonic Head on Straight
 2003 Metallica St. Anger
 2004 The Tea Party Seven Circles
 2004 Simple Plan Still Not Getting Any...
 2005 Mötley Crüe Red, White & Crüe (new material)
 2005 Our Lady Peace Healthy in Paranoid Times
 2006 Nina Gordon Bleeding Heart Graffiti
 2006 Lostprophets Liberation Transmission
 2006 Joan Jett & the Blackhearts Sinner
 2006 The Tragically Hip World Container
 2007 Payolas Langford Part 1
 2007 Michael Bublé Call Me Irresponsible
 2008 Gavin Rossdale Wanderlust
 2008 The Offspring Rise and Fall, Rage and Grace
 2008 The Sessions The Sessions Is Listed as In a Relationship
 2008 D.O.A Northern Avenger
 2009 The Tragically Hip We Are the Same
 2009 311 Uplifter
 2009 Art Bergmann Lost Art Bergmann
 2009 Michael Bublé Crazy Love
 2010 Michael Bublé Crazy Love (Hollywood Edition)
 2010 American Bang American Bang
 2011 Sins of the Fallen Son End Time
 2011 311 Universal Pulse
 2011 Bush The Sea of Memories
 2011 Jann Arden Uncover Me 2
 2011 Michael Bublé Christmas
 2011 Ron Sexsmith Long Player Late Bloomer
 2012 The Cult Choice of Weapon
 2012 Loverboy Rock 'n' Roll Revival
 2012 The Offspring Days Go By
 2012 Nelly Furtado The Spirit Indestructible
 2013 Michael Bublé To Be Loved
 2014 Black Veil Brides Black Veil Brides IV
 2014 Sarah McLachlan Shine On
 2014 Jann Arden Everything Almost
 2014 Bryan Adams Tracks of My Years
 2015 The Offspring Coming for You (Single)
 2016 The Cult Hidden City
 2017 Bush Black and White Rainbows
 2018 Jann Arden These Are the Days
 2018 RSO (Richie Sambora and Orianthi) Radio Free America
 2019 Bryan Adams Shine a Light
 2019 Mötley Crüe The Dirt
 2021 The Damn Truth This Is Who We Are Now
 2021 The Offspring Let the Bad Times Roll

Engineer/mixer

 1979 Prism Armageddon
 1979 Survivor Survivor
 1979 Servant Shallow Water
 1980 Private Lines Trouble in School assistant engineer
 1980 Prism Young and Restless
 1980 Loverboy Loverboy
 1980 Modernettes Teen City
 1981 Servant Rockin' Revival
 1981 Loverboy Get Lucky
 1982 Strange Advance Worlds Away
 1982 Payolas No Stranger to Danger
 1983 Loverboy Keep it Up
 1983 Payolas Hammer on a Drum
 1984 Krokus The Blitz
 1984 Sins of the Fallen Son The Raven
 1984 Chilliwack Look in Look Out
 1985 Paul Hyde and the Payolas Here's the World for Ya
 1985 Northern Lights "Tears Are Not Enough"
 1985 Black 'n Blue Without Love
 1986 Zappacosta A to Z
 1986 Honeymoon Suite The Big Prize
 1986 Paul Janz Electricity
 1986 Bon Jovi Slippery When Wet
 1987 Rock and Hyde Under the Volcano
 1987 Loverboy Wildside
 1987 Aerosmith Permanent Vacation
 1988 Bon Jovi New Jersey
 1989 Paul Dean Hard Core
 2022 Kirk HammettPortals

See also

Music of Canada
Canadian Music Hall of Fame

References

External links
 
 
 Entry at thecanadianencyclopedia.ca

1954 births
Living people
Canadian audio engineers
Canadian record producers
Canadian rock guitarists
Canadian male guitarists
Canadian new wave musicians
Jack Richardson Producer of the Year Award winners
Juno Award for Recording Engineer of the Year winners
Juno Award for Songwriter of the Year winners
Metallica members
Musicians from British Columbia
Musicians from Winnipeg
People from the Capital Regional District
Canadian Music Hall of Fame inductees